Allegany County is a county in the Southern Tier of the U.S. state of New York. As of the 2020 census, the population was 46,456. Its county seat is Belmont. Its name derives from a Lenape word, applied by European-American settlers of Western New York State to a trail that followed the Allegheny River; they also named the county after this.

The county is bisected by the Genesee River, flowing north to its mouth on Lake Ontario. During the mid-nineteenth century, the Genesee Valley Canal was built to link southern markets to the Great Lakes and Mohawk River. The county was also served by railroads, which soon superseded the canals in their capacity for carrying freight. Part of the Oil Springs Reservation, controlled by the Seneca Nation, is located in the county.

History
For centuries, Allegany County was the territory of the Seneca people, at the westernmost nation of the Five Nations of the Haudenosaunee, a confederacy of Iroquoian languages-speaking peoples. European-American permanent settlement did not take place until after the American Revolutionary War and the forced cession by the Seneca of most of their lands in western New York. New York State sold off the lands cheaply to attract new European-American settlers and agricultural development.

The first County Seat was established at Angelica, New York, where it remained for half a century. It was later moved to Belmont, a village located along the Genesee River. On June 12, 1812, the legislature authorized the attachment of Cattaraugus County, New York, to Allegany County for administration reasons, but for practical reasons this action did not take place at that time. However, on April 13, 1814, the eastern half of Cattaraugus County was so attached and administered from Belmont. This attachment was ended on March 28, 1817. With continued settlement through the mid-nineteenth century, the legislature periodically adjusted county borders as new counties were organized in western New York. On March 23, 1857, Allegany County lost another  to Livingston County, passing the Ossian, New York, area to Livingston County, and establishing the current border between them.

Geography

Allegany County is in the southwestern part of New York State, along the Pennsylvania border. Allegany County does not lie along the Allegheny River, as its name would suggest. This is the highest point in the state west of the Catskill Mountains. The highest point of Interstate 86 is located in the Town of West Almond with an elevation of 2,110 feet. This is also believed to be the highest point of any interstate in the New York. The county is unique from a watershed perspective as it is providing water to three major watersheds of North America: The eastern part near Alfred has Canacadea Creek that goes into the Canisteo River, Susquehanna River and eventually to Chesapeake Bay.

The Genesee River bisects the county from south to north, flowing north out of the County through Letchworth State Park with its three waterfalls on to Rochester over three more waterfalls to its mouth on Lake Ontario and then on to the St. Lawrence River and Atlantic Ocean. The southwestern part of the County flows into the Allegheny River that flows into the Ohio and then to the Mississippi River basin to the Gulf of Mexico.

Flooding took place in the valley communities of Wellsville, Belmont, Belfast, and others in the county.

Long a necessary transportation waterway for the Seneca and other Native Americans, and successive European-American settlers, since the late 20th century, the Genesee River has been extremely popular with canoeists. The river is also favored by fishermen as it abounds in smallmouth bass, trout and panfish.

Adjacent counties
 Livingston County – northeast
 Steuben County – east
 Potter County, Pennsylvania – southeast
 McKean County, Pennsylvania – southwest
 Cattaraugus County – west
 Wyoming County – northwest

Major highways
  Interstate 86 (Southern Tier Expressway)
  New York State Route 17 (Southern Tier Expressway)
  New York State Route 19
  New York State Route 21
  New York State Route 305
  New York State Route 417

Demographics

As of the census of 2020, there were 46,456 people. Based on earlier (2000) censuses, there were 18,009 households, and 12,192 families residing in the county. The population density was 48 people per square mile (19/km2). There were 24,505 housing units at an average density of 24 per square mile (9/km2). The racial makeup of the county was 97.03% White, 0.72% Black or African American, 0.28% Native American, 0.72% Asian, 0.37% from other races, and 0.88% from two or more races. 0.91% of the population were Hispanic or Latino of any race. 22.3% identified as being of German, 16.6% English, 13.8% Irish, 11.9% American and 7.0% Italian ancestry according to Census 2000. 96.5% spoke English and 1.3% Spanish as their first language.

There were 18,009 households, out of which 31.50% had children under the age of 18 living with them, 54.20% were married couples living together, 9.00% had a female householder with no husband present, and 32.30% were non-families. 26.00% of all households were made up of individuals, and 11.30% had someone living alone who was 65 years of age or older. The average household size was 2.53 and the average family size was 3.04.

In the county, the population was spread out, with 24.40% under the age of 18, 15.50% from 18 to 24, 23.90% from 25 to 44, 22.20% from 45 to 64, and 14.00% who were 65 years of age or older. The median age was 35 years. For every 100 females there were 99.80 males. For every 100 females age 18 and over, there were 98.10 males.

The median income for a household in the county was $32,106, and the median income for a family was $38,580. Males had a median income of $30,401 versus $21,466 for females. The per capita income for the county was $14,975. About 10.50% of families and 15.50% of the population were below the poverty line, including 19.20% of those under age 18 and 7.50% of those age 65 or over.

2020 Census

Government and politics

|}

Allegany County is considered a conservative county, routinely supporting Republican national and state candidates. In 2004, it voted for George W. Bush over John Kerry 63% to 34%, and in 2008 it voted for John McCain over Barack Obama 59% to 39%. It has been reported that in the last 170 years, the only Democratic candidates to win were Franklin Pierce in 1852 and Lyndon B. Johnson in 1964. 
Even in 1964, when Republican nominee Barry Goldwater lost the county by 14 points, he still managed to carry the towns of Centerville, Caneadea, Granger, Hume, and Rushford.
In 2006, neither Democrat Eliot Spitzer or Hillary Clinton carried it in their otherwise landslide elections for governor and US senator, respectively. Eliot Spitzer lost 48.98% to John Faso's 49.03%. Hillary Clinton lost the county by 3 points. In 2010, Andrew Cuomo lost by a wide margin while Senator Chuck Schumer carried it by a narrow margin of 49.46% to Jay Townsend's 48.86% a margin of 78 votes. It was one of only two counties that Senator Kirsten Gillibrand lost to Wendy Long in 2012.

Allegany is part of New York's 23rd congressional district, which has a Cook Partisan Voting Index of R+6.  In the New York State Senate, it is part of the 57th district and is represented by Republican George M. Borrello. In the New York State Assembly, the county is in the 148th Assembly District represented by Republican Joseph Giglio.

The Allegany Board of Legislators consists of 15 members from five three-member districts. , the Board consists of 14 Republicans and one Independent. The current chairman is Curtis W. Crandall. The County Administrator is Carissa M. Knapp.

Allegany County is divided into 29 towns and 10 villages. There are no cities as designated by New York State Law. The border between Allegany and Steuben County runs through the Village of Almond. The towns and villages by County Legislative District are as follows:

District I: Angelica, Belfast, Caneadea, Centerville, Granger, Hume, Rushford, and the Village of Angelica.

District II: Amity, Clarksville, Cuba, Friendship, New Hudson, Ward, and the Villages of Belmont and Cuba.

District III: Alma, Bolivar, Genesee, Independence, Scio, Willing, Wirt, and the Villages of Bolivar and Richburg.

District IV: Andover, Wellsville and the Villages of Andover and Wellsville.

District V: Alfred, Allen, Almond, Birdsall, Burns, Grove, West Almond and the Villages of Alfred, Almond, and Canaseraga.

The Oil Springs Reservation is an Indian Reservation of the Seneca Nation shared with Cattaraugus County having a total area of only . This is the site of the famed spring described by the Franciscan Missionary Joseph DeLa Roch D'Allion in 1627, the first recorded mention of oil on the North American Continent. In 1927, the New York State Oil Producers Association sponsored the dedication of a monument at the site describing the history of the oil industry in North America. There is a small park with parking and a foot bridge to the monument. The remainder of the reservation is mostly utilized for cottages on Cuba Lake, Seneca run gas stations and woodlands.

Education
Higher education facilities include Alfred University, the New York State College of Ceramics (a member of SUNY), Alfred State College, and Houghton College. The county has twelve school districts with their buildings in the county and parts of an additional six districts. Districts include: Alfred-Almond Central, Canaseraga Central that are part of the Greater Southern Tier BOCES with a facility in Hornell. Districts in association with the Cattaraugus-Allegany BOCES include: Andover Central, Whitesville Central, Wellsville Central, Bolivar-Richburg Central, Scio Central, Genesee Valley Central, Belfast Central, Fillmore Central, Friendship Central, and Cuba-Rushford Central. Districts with their buildings outside the County include Portville, Pioneer, Letchworth, and Keshequa. There are two private schools: Immaculate Conception in Wellsville and Houghton Academy in Houghton. There are also two Montessori Schools in Wellsville and Alfred.

Communities
Allegany County comprises 29 towns and 10 villages.

† - County Seat

‡ - Not Wholly in this county

Towns

 Alfred
 Allen
 Alma
 Almond
 Amity
 Andover
 Angelica
 Belfast
 Birdsall
 Bolivar
 Burns
 Caneadea
 Centerville
 Clarksville
 Cuba
 Friendship
 Genesee
 Granger
 Grove
 Hume
 Independence
 New Hudson
 Rushford
 Scio
 Ward
 Wellsville
 West Almond
 Willing
 Wirt

Hamlets
 Black Creek
 McGrawville
 Petrolia

Indian reservations 
 Oil Springs Reservation (part)

See also

 List of counties in New York
 National Register of Historic Places listings in Allegany County, New York
 Allegany (town), New York
 Allegany (village), New York
 Alleghany County (disambiguation)

Notes

References

Further reading

External links

 
 Alfred University
Alfred State College 
 Houghton College
Allegany County Tourism Information
  Allegany County Data and Information Resource
 Links to historical information about Allegany County
 Historical summary of Allegany County and its subdivisions

 
1806 establishments in New York (state)
Populated places established in 1806
Counties of Appalachia
New York placenames of Native American origin